The Forme Tour was a men's professional golf tour played in the United States. The tour was created by the PGA Tour in 2021 in response to COVID-19 pandemic related restrictions on travel between the United States and Canada, in order to provide competition for non-Canadian PGA Tour Canada members, with entry also available through a series seven of Q-School events. Eight tournaments were initially announced, to be held between June and September. The tournaments offered Official World Golf Ranking points, and the top five players on the points list at the end of the season gained Korn Ferry Tour membership for the 2022 season. 

The tour was sponsored by Forme, a clothing company.

A separate tour, the 2021 PGA Tour Canada, was run for Canadian-based professionals. This tour also consisted of eight events.

The schedule consisted of eight tournaments; four sets of back-to-back events played on successive weeks, finishing on either a Friday or a Saturday.

Schedule

The following table lists official events during the 2021 season.

Order of Merit
The Order of Merit was titled as the Points List and was based on prize money won during the season, calculated using a points-based system. The top five players on the tour earned status to play on the 2022 Korn Ferry Tour.

Notes

References

External links

Professional golf tours
Golf in the United States
2021 establishments in the United States
2021 in golf